The pharmaceutical industry in Switzerland directly and indirectly employs about 135,000 people. It contributes to 5.7% of the gross domestic product of Switzerland and contributes to 30% of the country's exports. In 2017 about 30% of Swiss exports (worth $84.8 billion) were chemical products. In the same year Switzerland was the second largest exporter of packaged medicine in the world, with about 11% of the global total, worth $36.5 billion.

Switzerland is home to many pharmaceutical companies, including very large groups, such as Novartis and Hoffmann-La Roche. In 2013, 41 life science companies had their international headquarters (and 29 more their regional headquarters) in Switzerland.

History 
 1896: foundation of Hoffmann-La Roche.
 1933: foundation of Interpharma.
 1950s: Cilag merged with Janssen Pharmaceutica, into Janssen-Cilag.
 1996: Ciba-Geigy merged with Sandoz, with the pharmaceutical and agrochemical divisions of both staying together to form Novartis. Other Ciba-Geigy and Sandoz businesses were sold off, or, like Ciba Specialty Chemicals, were spun off as independent companies. The Sandoz brand disappeared for three years, but was revived in 2003 when Novartis consolidated its generic drugs businesses into a single subsidiary and named it Sandoz.
 1990: Hoffmann-La Roche owned a majority of Genentech. It was to be completely integrated in 2009.
 2000: Novartis divested its agrochemical and genetically modified crops business with the spinout of Syngenta, in partnership with AstraZeneca, which also divested its agrochemical business.

Companies 
A number of pharmaceutical companies are headquartered in Switzerland:
 Hoffmann-La Roche: Basel
 Novartis: Basel
 Alcon: Geneva
 Bayer: Basel (Consumer Health Division, Hemophilia & Ophthalmology Pharma Global HQ Divisions with some Oncology)
 Lonza Group: Basel
 Abbott: Basel (Established Pharmaceuticals Division)
 Galenica: Bern
 Actelion (Johnson & Johnson): Basel
 Janssen-Cilag (Johnson & Johnson)
 Sonova: Stäfa
 Galderma: Zug
 Ferring Pharmaceuticals: Saint-Prex
 Octapharma: Lachen, Switzerland
 Vifor Pharma: St.Gallen
 Straumann: Basel
 Tecan: Männedorf
 Siegfried Holding: Zofingen
 Medela: Baar
 Acino Holding: Zurich
 Ypsomed: Burgdorf
 OM Pharma: Meyrin
 Basilea Pharmaceutica: Basel
 Debiopharm: Lausanne
 Genedata: Basel
 Bachem: Basel
 Molecular Partners: Zurich
 Senn Chemicals: Dielsdorf
 NBE-Therapeutics: Basel
 Santhera: Basel
 AC Immune: Lausanne
 Idorsia: Basel
 VAXIMM: Basel
 Cerbios-Pharma: Lugano
 Finox Biotech: Kirchberg
 Helsinn: Lugano
 Novimmune: Geneva
 Neovii Pharmaceuticals: Rapperswill
 Biognosys: Zurich
 InSphero: Schlieren
 NovaCurie: Bern

Additionally, several non-domestic pharmaceutical companies have regional headquarters in Switzerland, including:
 Accuray: Morges (International Headquarters)
 Alexion Pharmaceuticals: Zurich (EMEA Headquarters)
 Amgen: Rotkreuz (European Hub)
 Baxter International: Zurich (European Headquarters)
 Beckman Coulter: Nyon (European and Emerging Markets Headquarters)
 Becton Dickinson: Eysins (European Headquarters)
 Biogen: Baar (International Headquarters)
 Bio-Rad: Basel (European Headquarters)
 Caris Life Sciences: Basel (European Headquarters)
 Bristol Myers Squibb: Boudry
 Cochlear Limited: Basel (European Headquarters)
 Edwards Lifesciences: Nyon (European Headquarters)
 Exact Sciences: Geneva (International Operations)
 Incyte: Morges (European Headquarters)
 Intuitive Surgical: Aubonne (European Headquarters)
 Masimo: Neuchatel (International Headquarters)
 Medtronic: Tolochenaz (Europe & Central Asia Headquarters)
 Novo Nordisk: Zurich (International Operations)
 STAAR Surgical: Nidau (International Headquarters)
 SOTIO Biotech AG (European Hub)
 Takeda Pharmaceutical: Zurich (Europe & Canada Business Unit)

Finally, other companies with relevant international activities in Switzerland are:
 GlaxoSmithKline
 Merck Group

Life sciences 
70% of the investments in life sciences in Europe are made in the United Kingdom, Germany, Ireland, the Netherlands, France, and Switzerland.

In addition to pharmaceutical companies (65 companies), Switzerland is home to many companies in the fields of biotechnology (338 companies) or medical devices and technology (341 companies). According to KPMG, there are 120 life science companies in Basel, 132 in Zürich and 92 in the Lemanic region.

In 2013, 41 life science companies had their international headquarters (and 29 more their regional headquarters) in Switzerland. In Switzerland, there are about 51,000 workers in the field of medical technologies (1,600 companies) and 13,700 on the field of biotechnologies.

Hubs

Basel region 
According to Le Temps, there are about 900 pharmaceutical and medtech companies (50,000 workers) in the region of Basel. The region of Zurich, mainly active in medical technologies employs 21,000 workers.

Lemanic region 

According to L'Hebdo, there are 750 biotech and medtech companies (20,000 employees) in the Lemanic region. Among them, 450 companies develop and/or produce drugs. In addition to that, there are 500 laboratories from universities and university hospitals (in the Lemanic region).

See also 
 Economy of Switzerland, List of companies of Switzerland
 Science and technology in Switzerland
 European Federation of Pharmaceutical Industries and Associations, List of pharmaceutical companies
 List of largest European manufacturing companies by revenue, List of largest manufacturing companies by revenue
 Life Sciences Switzerland
 Health Valley

Notes and references

Bibliography 
  Karl Lüönd, Principe actif: la connaissance. Passé et présent de l'industrie pharmaceutique suisse, Interpharma and éditions Neue Zürcher Zeitung, 2008.

External links 

 Interpharma

Pharmaceutical companies of Switzerland
Industry in Switzerland
Switzerland